In mathematics, a quasirandom group is a group that does not contain a large product-free subset. Such groups are precisely those without a small non-trivial irreducible representation. The namesake of these groups stems from their connection to graph theory: bipartite Cayley graphs over any subset of a quasirandom group are always bipartite  quasirandom graphs.

Motivation 

The notion of quasirandom groups arises when considering subsets of groups for which no two elements in the subset have a product in the subset; such subsets are termed product-free. László Babai and Vera Sós asked about the existence of a constant  for which every finite group  with order  has a product-free subset with size at least . A well-known result of Paul Erdős about sum-free sets of integers can be used to prove that  suffices for abelian groups, but it turns out that such a constant does not exist for non-abelian groups.

Both non-trivial lower and upper bounds are now known for the size of the largest product-free subset of a group with order . In the process of proving the upper bound, Timothy Gowers defined the notion of a quasirandom group to encapsulate the product-free condition and proved equivalences involving quasirandomness in graph theory.

Graph quasirandomness 

Formally, it does not make sense to talk about whether or not a single group is quasirandom. The strict definition of quasirandomness will apply to sequences of groups, but first bipartite graph quasirandomness must be defined. The motivation for considering sequences of groups stems from its connections with graphons, which are defined as limits of graphs in a certain sense.

 

It is a result of Chung–Graham–Wilson that each of the above conditions is equivalent.

Though quasirandomness can only be defined for sequences of graphs, a notion of -quasirandomness can be defined for a specific graph by allowing an error tolerance in any of the above definitions of graph quasirandomness. To be specific, given any of the equivalent definitions of quasirandomness, the  term can be replaced by a small constant , and any graph satisfying that particular modified condition can be termed -quasirandom. It turns out that -quasirandomness under any condition is equivalent to -quasirandomness under any other condition for some absolute constant 

The next step for defining group quasirandomness is the Cayley graph. Bipartite Cayley graphs give a way from translating quasirandomness in the graph-theoretic setting to the group-theoretic setting.

Definition 

With the tools defined above, one can now define group quasirandomness.

Though quasirandomness can only be defined for sequences of groups, the concept of -quasirandomness for specific groups can be extended to groups using the definition of -quasirandomness for specific graphs.

Properties 

As proved by Gowers, group quasirandomness turns out to be equivalent to a number of different conditions.

To be precise, given a sequence of groups , the following are equivalent:

Cayley graphs generated from pseudorandom groups have  strong mixing properties; that is,  is a bipartite -graph for some  tending to zero as  tends to infinity. (Recall that an  graph is a graph with  vertices, each with degree , whose adjacency matrix has a second largest eigenvalue of at most )

Examples 

There are several notable families of quasirandom groups. In each case, the quasirandomness properties are most easily verified by checking the dimension of its smallest non-trivial representation.

 The projective special linear groups  for prime  form a sequence of quasirandom groups, since a classic result of Frobenius states that its smallest non-trivial representation has dimension at least  In fact, these groups are the groups with the largest known minimal non-trivial representation, as a function of group order.
 The alternating groups  are quasirandom, since its smallest non-trivial representation has dimension 
 Any sequence of non-cyclic simple groups with increasing order is quasirandom, since its smallest non-trivial representation has dimension at least , where  is the order of the group.

References

Graph theory
Group theory